Slovak Space Policy Association  (SSPA) is a non-governmental organization, which deals with space security, law and economic aspects of the peaceful uses of outer space. It is the only fully professional think tank in the area of space policy in Slovakia. Its main mission is to promote public discussion on space-related themes that affect society, science and research, economy, and also foreign and security policy objectives of Slovakia. SSPA publishes its own in-house publication SSPA Reports, which has been granted .

SSPA team has a proven academic and professional experience  in policy, security and legal aspects of the use of outer space with a significant experience in publication activities, both in professional and scientific journals, as well as in lecturing at international conferences and congresses. SSPA members have conducted several work-related stays and internships in distinguished institutions, such as the European Space Agency (ESA), National Aeronautics and Space Administration (NASA), European Centre for Space Law (ECSL), European Space Policy Institute (ESPI), European Commission and United Nations Office for Outer Space Affairs (UN OOSA). Moreover, SSPA is (through its members) a national point of contact for the Space Generation Advisory Council (SGAC) and a member of regional think-tanks network in the framework of IRSEC Hub project.

References

External links 
 Official website of SSPA

European space programmes
Science and technology in Slovakia
Scientific organisations based in Slovakia
Organisations based in Slovakia